Girei is a town and local government area of Adamawa State, Nigeria. It lies on the Benue River. The dominant tribe in the area are the Fulɓe or Fulani; however, a substantial number of Bwatiye also dwell in villages such as Greng, Ntabo, and Labondo within the Girei local government area. The primary occupation of the people in the area is farming and cattle rearing. Girei is also a home to Radio Gotel.

Local Government Areas in Adamawa State